The Intimate P. D. Q. Bach is "a live recording of The Intimate P.D.Q. Bach stage show, featuring Professor Peter Schickele and the Semi-Pro Musica Antiqua" and was released on Vanguard Records in 1974. Many of the performer credits are humorous, and as with all P.D.Q. Bach recordings, the "S" numbers are fictitious and humorous. The cover art is a parody of the painting Kreutzer Sonata.

Performers
Professor Peter Schickele, beriberitone, calliope, siren (Quaint Old Innkeeper, Hansel Hunter, Monk, Doctor)
John Ferrante, bargain counter tenor, harpsichord, razzer (Gretel Red Riding Hood, Village Idiot, Teddy Nice)
David Oei, piano, police whistle
John Nelson, singist
Peter Rosenfeld, celloist
Arthur Weisberg, bassooner

Track listing 
Spoken introduction
Hansel and Gretel and Ted and Alice, an opera in one unnatural act, S. 2n-1 
Overture
Aria: "I am a quaint old innkeeper"
Aria: "Like a lonely pilgrim"
Aria: "My name is Hansel Hunter"
Aria: "I'm the village idiot"
Aria: "Et expecto" (Monk’s Aria)
Aria: "There's something about a monk"
Duet: "Do you love me?"
Interlude: Medical examination
Aria: "I hope you'll take this friendly advice"
Aria: "Teddy Nice is my name"
Duet: "Jump not to conclusions"
Finale: "Just tell me what your name is"
The O.K. Chorale from the Toot Suite for calliope four hands, S. 212°
Spoken introduction
"Erotica" Variations, for banned instruments and piano, S. 36EE
Theme: Windbreaker
Variation I: Balloons
Variation II: Slide Whistle
Variation III: Slide Windbreaker
Variation IV: Lasso D'Amore
Variation V: Foghorn, Bell, Kazoo, Gargle
Spoken introduction
The Art of the Ground Round, for three baritones and discontinuo, S. 1.19/lb
Loving is as easy
Please, kind sir
Jane, my Jane
Golly golly oh
Nelly is a nice girl

Sources
 The Intimate P.D.Q. Bach, schickele.com
 The Intimate P.D.Q. Bach, Vanguard VSD 79335 (1973)

P. D. Q. Bach live albums
1974 live albums
1970s comedy albums